Troutbeck Bridge is a village  in South Lakeland, Cumbria, England. The main secondary school for Windermere and Ambleside, The Lakes School, is located in the village, as is the postal sorting office for the area. Troutbeck Bridge takes its name from where the road crosses the Trout Beck.

The community is served by a petrol station and convenience store, an inn and restaurant, a secondary school and a gym.

History 

The Calgarth Estate was a wartime housing estate built to house the workers of the nearby flying boat factory at White Cross Bay. By the end of the Second World War the workers had returned to their homes throughout Britain and in 1945 three hundred child survivors of the Holocaust, later known as the Windermere Boys, arrived from Eastern Europe to the Calgarth Estate to begin new lives: a film of their experience titled The Windermere Children was released in 2020. The site is now occupied by The Lakes School.

Transport 

The A591 road passes through Troutbeck Bridge, with Windermere to the south and Ambleside to the north.

See also 

Listed buildings in Windermere, Cumbria (town)

References 

Villages in Cumbria
South Lakeland District
Westmorland